The 1964 Grand National was the 118th renewal of the Grand National horse race that took place at Aintree Racecourse near Liverpool, England, on 21 March 1964. Thirty-three horses ran and the race was won narrowly by American-owned 12-year-old Team Spirit, at odds of 18/1. He was ridden by jockey Willie Robinson and trained by Fulke Walwyn.

The journalist and broadcaster Nancy Spain and her partner, the magazine editor Joan Werner Laurie, were among five people killed when their light aircraft crashed near the racecourse on the day of the race, which they were travelling to attend.

Finishing order

Non-finishers

Media coverage

Grand National Grandstand on the BBC again provided the television coverage. For the third year running the commentary team remained unchanged with Peter O'Sullevan leading them off and finishing the race, Bob Haynes calling them over the first four fences before Peter Montague-Evans took them over the signature fences out in the country, Becher's Brook, Canal Turn and Valentine's Brook before handing back to O'Sullevan in the grandstand once they reached the Anchor Bridge crossing.

References

 1964
Grand National
Grand National
Grand National
20th century in Lancashire